(or Kii-Nagashima) was a town located in Kitamuro District, Mie Prefecture, Japan. On October 11, 2005, Kiinagashima, along with the town of Miyama (also from Kitamuro District), was merged to create the town of Kihoku.

References

Dissolved municipalities of Mie Prefecture